The 2022 Empress's Cup final was the final of the 2022 Empress's Cup, the 44th edition of the Empress's Cup.

The match will be contested at the Yodoko Sakura Stadium in Osaka,Japan.

Teams

Road to the final

Format
The final was played as a single match. If tied after regulation time, extra time and, would it necessary, a penalty shoot-out would have been used to decide the winning team.

Details

See also
Japan Football Association (JFA)
2022–23 WE League season
2022–23 WE League Cup

References

External links
Empress's Cup JFA 44th Japan Football Championship 
天皇杯 JFA 第44回全日本サッカー選手権大会 

2022 in Japanese women's football
2022 in Asian football
2022 in Japanese sport